The 1962 Preakness Stakes was the 87th running of the $200,000 Preakness Stakes thoroughbred horse race. The race took place on May 19, 1962, and was televised in the United States on the CBS television network. Greek Money, who was jockeyed by John L. Rotz, won the race by a scant nose over runner-up Ridan (horse) in a fighting finish. Approximate post time was 5:50 p.m. Eastern Time. The race was run on a fast track in a final time of 1:56-1/5. The Maryland Jockey Club reported total attendance of 33,854, this is recorded as second highest on the list of American thoroughbred racing top attended events for North America in 1962.

Payout 

The 87th Preakness Stakes Payout Schedule

The full chart 

 Winning Breeder: Renappi Corporation; (KY)
 Winning Time: 1:56 1/5
 Track Condition: Fast
 Total Attendance: 33,854

References

External links 
 

1962
1962 in horse racing
1962 in American sports
1962 in sports in Maryland
Horse races in Maryland